Instant Messaging and Presence Protocol (IMPP) was an IETF working group created for the purpose of developing an architecture for simple instant messaging and presence awareness/notification. It was created on 1999-02-25 and concluded on 2004-09-08.

Documents
2000-02 RFC 2778: A Model for Presence and Instant Messaging (Informational) 			
2000-02 RFC 2779: Instant Messaging / Presence Protocol Requirements (Informational) 			
2002-07 RFC 3339: Date and Time on the Internet: Timestamps (Proposed Standard)
2004-08 RFC 3859: Common Profile for Presence (CPP) (Proposed Standard)
2004-08 RFC 3860: Common Profile for Instant Messaging (CPIM) (Proposed Standard)
2004-08 RFC 3861: Address Resolution for Instant Messaging and Presence (Proposed Standard)
2004-08 RFC 3862: Common Presence and Instant Messaging (CPIM): Message Format (Proposed Standard)
2004-08 RFC 3863: Presence Information Data Format (PIDF) (Proposed Standard)

See also
Presence and Instant Messaging (PRIM)
SIP for Instant Messaging and Presence Leveraging Extensions (SIMPLE)
Extensible Messaging and Presence Protocol (XMPP) AKA Jabber

External links
Instant Messaging and Presence Protocol (impp) WG - IETF Datatracker

Instant messaging protocols
Working groups